John Kyle may refer to:

John Joseph Jolly Kyle (1838–1922), Scottish-born Argentine chemist
John C. Kyle (1851–1913), American politician from Mississippi
John W. Kyle (1891–1965), American politician and jurist from Mississippi
John W. Kyle State Park in Mississippi, named after above
Johnny Kyle (1898–1974), American NFL football player
John Wilson Kyle (1926–2014), Northern Ireland rugby player, a/k/a Jack Kyle or Jackie Kyle
John Kyle (Northern Ireland politician) (born 1951), Councillor on Belfast City Council

See also
John Henry Kyl (1919–2002), American member of Congress      
Jon Kyl (born 1942), American senator from Arizona, son of above